James Harry Butler is an American politician who served as a Republican member of the West Virginia House of Delegates from 14th district from 2012 to 2020. In 2022, he was elected to the House again from the 18th district.

Elections
2012 With District 14 incumbent Republican Representative Troy Andes redistricted to District 15, Butler ran in the three-way May 8, 2012 Republican Primary and placed first with 710 votes (41.1%), and won the November 6, 2012 General election with 3,368 votes (54.2%) against Democratic nominee Jimmie Wood.
2022 After 2020 redistricting, Butler ran against Johnnie Wamsley, his 2020 successor, for the 18th district. Butler defeated Wamsley in a primary, and went unchallenged.

References

External links
Official page at the West Virginia Legislature
Campaign site

Jim Butler at Ballotpedia
Jim Butler at the National Institute on Money in State Politics

Place of birth missing (living people)
Living people
Republican Party members of the West Virginia House of Delegates
People from Mason County, West Virginia
United States Marines
21st-century American politicians
1965 births